James Erskine may refer to:

James Erskine, 6th Earl of Buchan (died 1640)
James Erskine, 7th Earl of Buchan (died 1664), Earl of Buchan
Sir James Erskine, 2nd Baronet (c. 1670–1693), of the Erskine baronets
James Erskine (Aberdeen MP) (born 1671), Scottish soldier and politician
James Erskine, Lord Grange (1679–1754), Scottish judge and Jacobite
James Erskine, Lord Alva (c. 1720–1796), Scottish judge, Knight Marischal
James St Clair-Erskine, 2nd Earl of Rosslyn (1762–1837), Scottish soldier and politician
Sir James Erskine, 3rd Baronet (1772–1825), of the Erskine baronets
Sir James Erskine (Royal Navy officer) (1838–1911), Admiral of the Fleet
James Erskine, Earl of Mar and Kellie (born 1949), Scottish Liberal Democrat member of the House of Lords
James Erskine (Conservative politician) (1863–1944), British Member of Parliament for Westminster St George's, 1921–1929
James Erskine (filmmaker), British screenwriter, film director and producer